Sarisha Union is a union parishad under Ishwarganj Upazila of Mymensingh District in the division of Mymensingh, Bangladesh.

References 

Ishwarganj Upazila
Mymensingh